Md. Mozammel Haque (1928-2017) is a Bangladesh Nationalist Party politician, industrialist, and the former Member of Parliament from Chuadanga-2.He is credited to have founded One of Bangladesh's First Automated Spinning Mills Tallu Spinning Mills.He was The Chairman of Bangas-Tallu Group, one of Bangladesh's Largest Conglomerates and founded Bangladesh's First Privately-held Radio Station Radio Today.

Career
Haque was elected to parliament from Chuadanga-2 in 1996, and 2001 as a candidate of Bangladesh Nationalist Party. From 1990 to 2014, he was the president of Chuadanga District unit of Bangladesh Nationalist Party. He was the Chairman of Mithun Knitting and Dying, Radio Today, and Tallu Spinning Mills. He remained in Bangas Ltd as its managing director.He was considered to be one of the closest Advisors to Khaleda Zia

Death
Haque died on 4 September 2017 in United Hospital, Dhaka, Bangladesh.

References

Bangladesh Nationalist Party politicians
2017 deaths
7th Jatiya Sangsad members
8th Jatiya Sangsad members
Bangladeshi businesspeople
People from Chuadanga District
1928 births